The RTÉ Sports Person of the Year Award is the titular award of the RTÉ Sports Awards ceremony, which takes place each December. The winner is the Irish sportsperson (from the island of Ireland) judged to have achieved the most that year. The winner was originally chosen by a special panel of RTÉ journalists and editorial staff, but was selected by a public vote from a pre-determined shortlist in 2016. The first Irish sports award ceremony took place in 1985, and was closely modelled on the BBC Sports Personality of the Year Award.

Four people have won the award multiple times: athlete Sonia O'Sullivan won the award five times, including a record three successive awards, and golfer Pádraig Harrington and boxer Katie Taylor, with three wins, and golfer Rory McIlroy, who won it twice. The oldest recipient of the award is Christy O'Connor Jnr, who won in 1989 aged 41. Rory McIlroy, who first won in 2011, aged 22, is the youngest winner. Ten sporting disciplines have been represented; golf has the highest representation, with eight recipients.

Eamonn Darcy, Ronan Rafferty and Des Smyth, who won the Alfred Dunhill Cup in 1988, are the only non-individual winners of the award. Counting them separately, there have been thirty-one winners of the award (from 1985 to 2021). Five of these have been Northern Irish. The most recent award was made in 2022 to Katie Taylor.

Winners

By number of wins 
This table lists those who have won more than once (ordered by the most wins, with the earliest win acting as a tie-breaker).

Accurate up-to and including the 2022 award.

By sport 
This table lists the total number of awards won by the winner's sport (ordered by number of wins, with the earliest win acting as a tie-breaker). The 3 winners in 1988 (all golfers) are counted separately. 

Accurate up-to and including the 2022 award.

By nationality 
This table lists the total number of awards won by each nationality.  The 3 winners in 1988 (two from the Republic of Ireland, and one from Northern Ireland) are counted separately. 

Accurate up-to and including the 2021 award.

By gender 
This table lists the total number of awards won by the winner's gender. There have not yet been any mixed-gender winners (unlike figure-skating couple Jayne Torvill and Christopher Dean in the British equivalent). The 3 (male) winners in 1988 are counted separately.

Accurate up-to and including the 2021 award.

By disability 
So far (as of the 2022 awards) all winners have been able-bodied athletes, but para athletes among the nominees have included Jason Smyth (para athletics) in 2012 to 2014, 2017 to 2019, and 2021, and Katie George Dunlevy and Eve McCrystal (para cycling) in 2016 and 2017.

2010s winners and nominees
The winner is in bold.

2010

  Katie Taylor (boxing)
  Graeme McDowell (golf)
  Gráinne Murphy (swimming)
  Tony McCoy (horse racing)
  Lar Corbett (hurling)
  Paddy Barnes (boxing)
  Tommy Bowe (rugby union)
  Derval O'Rourke (athletics)
  Rory McIlroy (golf)

2011

  Darren Clarke (golf)
  Michael Fennelly (hurling)
  Seán O'Brien (rugby union)
  Katie Taylor (boxing)
  Rory McIlroy (golf)
  John Joe Nevin (boxing)
  Kevin O'Brien (cricket)
  Alan Brogan (Gaelic football)
  Robbie Keane (soccer)

2012

  Fionnuala Britton (athletics)
  Rob Kearney (rugby union)
  Karl Lacey (Gaelic football)
  Rory McIlroy (golf)
  Michael McKillop (athletics)
  Joseph O'Brien (horse racing)
  Mark Rohan (cycling)
  Henry Shefflin (hurling)
  Jason Smyth (para athletics)
  Katie Taylor (boxing)

2013

  Robert Heffernan (athletics)
  Martyn Irvine (cycling)
  Tony Kelly (hurling)
  Michael Darragh MacAuley (Gaelic football)
  Tony McCoy (horse racing)
  Michael McKillop (athletics)
  Annalise Murphy (sailing)
  Joseph O'Brien (horse racing)
  Jason Quigley (boxing)
  Johnny Sexton (rugby union)
  Jason Smyth (para athletics)

2014

  Niamh Briggs (rugby union)
  Seamus Coleman (soccer)
  Briege Corkery (camogie and ladies' Gaelic football)
  Mark English (athletics)
  Carl Frampton (boxing)
  Rory McIlroy (golf)
  Michael McKillop (athletics)
  James O'Donoghue (Gaelic football)
  Johnny Sexton (rugby union)
  Jason Smyth (para athletics)
  Richie Hogan (hurling)
  Katie Taylor (boxing)

2015

  Michael Conlan (boxing)
  Leighton Aspell (horse racing)
  Rena Buckley (camogie)
  Andy Lee (boxing)
  Shane Lowry (golf)
  Jack McCaffrey (Gaelic football)
  Rory McIlroy (golf)
  Michael McKillop (athletics)
  Paul O'Connell (rugby union)
  TJ Reid (hurling)
  Sophie Spence (rugby union)
  Richie Towell (soccer)
  Jon Walters (soccer)
  Conor McGregor (MMA)

2016

  Séamus Callanan (hurling)
  Eoghan Clifford (cycling)
  Katie-George Dunlevy & Eve McCrystal (para cycling)
  Denise Gaule (camogie)
  Brian Fenton (Gaelic football)
  Carl Frampton (boxing)
  Daryl Horgan (soccer)
  Annalise Murphy (sailing)
  Conor McGregor (MMA)
  Paul O'Donovan (rowing)
  Jamie Heaslip (rugby union)
  Bríd Stack (ladies' Gaelic football)

2017
	
  Rena Buckley (Camogie)
  Ryan Burnett (Boxing)
  Joe Canning (Hurling)
  Katie George Dunlevy and Eve McCrystal (para cycling)
  Noëlle Healy (Ladies' Gaelic Football)
  James McClean (Soccer)
  Michael McKillop (Athletics)
  Andy Moran (Gaelic Football)
  Conor Murray (Rugby)
  Paul O'Donovan (Rowing)
  Robbie Power (Horse racing)
  Jason Smyth (Para athletics)
  Katie Taylor (Boxing)
  Joe Ward (Boxing)

2018

  Sinéad Aherne (Ladies' Gaelic Football)
  Thomas Barr (Athletics)
  Brian Fenton (Gaelic Football)
  Kellie Harrington (Boxing)
  Ellen Keane (Swimming)
  Cian Lynch (Hurling)
  Rhys McClenaghan (Gymnastics)
  Ayeisha McFerran (Hockey)
  Sanita Pušpure (Rowing)
  Davy Russell (Horse racing)
  Johnny Sexton (Rugby)
  Jason Smyth (Para athletics)
  Katie Taylor (Boxing)

2019

  Séamus Callanan (Hurling)
  Stephen Cluxton (Gaelic Football)
  Niamh Kilkenny (Camogie)
  Shane Lowry (Golf)
  Ciara Mageean (Athletics)
  Rhys McClenaghan (Gymnastics)
  Denise O'Sullivan (Soccer)
  Sanita Pušpure (Rowing)
  Jason Smyth (Para athletics)
  Katie Taylor (Boxing)

2020s winners and nominees
The winner is in bold.

2020

  Sanita Pušpure (Rowing)
  Sam Bennett (Cycling)
  Katie Taylor (Boxing)
  Ciarán Kilkenny (Gaelic Football)
  Gearóid Hegarty (Hurling)
  Colin Keane (Horse Racing)

2021

  Rachael Blackmore (Horse Racing)
  Kellie Harrington (Boxing)
  Ellen Keane (Swimming)
  Cian Lynch (Hurling)
  Leona Maguire (Golf)
  Jason Smyth (Para athletics)
  Katie Taylor (Boxing)
  Vikki Wall (Ladies' Gaelic football)

References

2000 establishments in Ireland
Awards established in 2000
 
Ire
RTÉ Sport
Irish sports trophies and awards